Margaret Macdonald Mackintosh (5 November 1864 – 7 January 1933) was an English-born artist who worked in Scotland, and whose design work became one of the defining features of the Glasgow Style during the 1890s - 1900s.

Biography
Born Margaret Macdonald, at Tipton, Staffordshire between Birmingham and Wolverhampton, her father was a colliery manager and engineer. Margaret and her younger sister Frances both attended the Orme Girls' School, Newcastle-under-Lyme, Staffordshire; their names are recorded in the school register. In the 1881 census Margaret, aged 16, was a visitor at someone else's house on census night and was listed as a scholar. By 1890 the family had settled in Glasgow and Margaret and her sister, Frances Macdonald, enrolled as day students at the Glasgow School of Art studying courses in design. There, she worked with a variety of media, including metalwork, embroidery, and textiles. Additionally, she joined other groups, such as the Scottish Society of Watercolor Painters in 1898.

She began collaborating with her sister Frances, and in 1896 the pair worked from their studio at 128 Hope Street, Glasgow, where they produced book illustrations, embroidery, gesso panels, leaded glass and repoussé metalwork. Their innovative work was inspired by Celtic imagery, literature, symbolism, and folklore. Margaret later collaborated with her husband, the architect and designer Charles Rennie Mackintosh, whom she married on 22 August 1900. Her most well-known works are the gesso panels made for interiors designed with Charles, such as tearooms and private residences.

Charles Rennie Mackintosh is frequently claimed to be Scotland's most famous architect. Margaret Macdonald Mackintosh was somewhat marginalised in comparison. Yet she was celebrated in her time by many of her peers, including her husband who once wrote in a letter to her, "Remember, you are half if not three-quarters in all my architectural work ..."; and reportedly "Margaret has genius, I have only talent."

Active and recognised during her career, between 1895 and 1924 she contributed to more than 40 European and American exhibitions. Poor health cut short Margaret's career and, as far as is known, she produced no work after 1921.   She died in 1933, just over four years after her husband.

"The Glasgow Four" and Collaborative Work

It is unclear exactly when the Macdonald sisters met Charles Rennie Mackintosh and his friend/colleague Herbert MacNair, but they probably met around 1892 at the Glasgow School of Art (Mackintosh and MacNair were studying as night students), introduced by the Headmaster Francis Newbery because he recognised that they were working in similar styles. By 1894 they were showing their work together in student exhibitions, some of which was made collaboratively. Reception of the work was mixed, and it was commented that the gaunt, linear forms of the Macdonald sisters' artwork - clearly showing the influence of Aubrey Beardsley - were 'ghoulish' and earned them the moniker 'The Spook School'. They became known locally as "The Four".

Most collaborative work in the 1890s was with her sister, particularly following the opening of their studio in 1896. Some works were made by both together, while others were series of works, such as a set of four paintings with repoussé frames on the seasons where each two works on the theme. They also created a set of illustrations for William Morris' Defence of Guenevere that was recently re-discovered in the special collections of the University at Buffalo.

She created several important interior schemes with her husband. Many of these were executed at the early part of the twentieth century; and include the Rose Boudoir at the International Exhibition at Turin in 1903, the designs for House for an Art Lover in 1900, and the Willow Tea Rooms in 1902. She exhibited with Mackintosh at the 1900 Vienna Secession, where she was an influence on the Secessionists Gustav Klimt and Josef Hoffmann. They continued to be popular in the Viennese art scene, both exhibiting at the Viennese International Art Exhibit in 1909.

In 1902, the couple received a major Viennese commission: Fritz Waerndorfer, the initial financer of the Wiener Werkstätte, was building a new villa outside Vienna showcasing the work of many local architects. Hoffmann and Koloman Moser were already designing two of its rooms; he invited the Mackintoshes to design the music room.  That room was decorated with panels of Margaret's art: the Opera of the Winds, the Opera of the Seas, and the Seven Princesses, a new wall-sized triptych considered by some to be her finest work. This collaboration was described by contemporary critic Amelia Levetus as "perhaps their greatest work, for they were allowed perfectly free scope".

Inspiration and style 
Mackintosh did not keep sketchbooks, which reflects her reliance on imagination rather than on nature. A few sources provided significant inspiration for her works, including the Bible, the Odyssey, poems by Morris and Rossetti, and the works of Maurice Maeterlinck. Her works, along with those works of her often collaborating sister, defied her contemporaries' conceptions of art. Gleeson White wrote, "With a delightfully innocent air these two sisters disclaim any attempt to acknowledge that Egyptian decoration has interested them specially. 'We have no basis.' Nor do they advance any theory."

The beginning of her artistic career reflects broad strokes of experimentation. Largely drawing from her imagination, she reinterpreted traditional themes, allegories, and symbols in inventive ways. For instance, immediately following the 1896 opening of her Glasgow studio with her sister, she transformed broad ideas such as "Time" and "Summer" into highly stylized human forms. Many of her works incorporate muted natural tones, elongated nude human forms, and a subtle interplay between geometric and natural motifs. Above all, her designs demonstrated a type of originality that distinguishes her from other artists of her time.

Popular work
Mackintosh's most popular works include the gesso panels The May Queen, which was made to partner Charles Rennie Mackintosh's panel The Wassail for Miss Cranston's Ingram Street Tearooms, and Oh ye, all ye that walk in Willowwood, which formed part of the decorative scheme for the Room de Luxe in the Willow Tearooms. All three of these are now on display in the Kelvingrove Museum in Glasgow. The 2017-18 restoration of The Willow Tearooms building has seen a recreation of "Oh ye, all ye that walk in Willowwood" installed in the original location within the Room de Luxe.

Her grandest work is the Seven Princesses, three wall-sized gesso panels showing a scene from a play by the same name, by Maurice Maeterlinck.  This work was extremely popular in Vienna and its surrounding art scene. When the Waerndorfer villa was sold in 1916, it disappeared from public view for a long time. In 1990, it was rediscovered in a crate in the basement of the Museum of Applied Arts in Vienna, and is now on permanent display in the MAK.

In 2008 her 1902 work The White Rose and the Red Rose was auctioned for 1.7 million UK pounds or $3.3 million.

In Fiction
Margaret Macdonald Mackintosh is the narrator of Kirsten MacQuarrie's short story, MMM, about the time the Mackintoshes spent in Port Vendres.

Gallery

References

External links

 Biography at the Charles Rennie Mackintosh Society
  works by Margaret Macdonald in the Hunterian Art Gallery Collections
 Information on The Group of Four from the Hunterian Art Gallery

1865 births
1933 deaths
Scottish women painters
People from Tipton
Alumni of the Glasgow School of Art
Glasgow School
Art Nouveau painters
Art Nouveau designers
Scottish designers
20th-century British women artists
British embroiderers